Mark Ulano (born June 12, 1954) is an American sound engineer. He has won an Academy Award for Best Sound and has been nominated for three in the same category. He has worked on more than 120 films since 1975.

Selected filmography
Ulano has won an Academy Award for Best Sound and has been nominated for three in the same category:

Won
 Titanic (1997)

Nominated
 Inglourious Basterds (2009)
 Ad Astra (2019)
 Once Upon a Time in Hollywood (2019)

References

External links

1954 births
Living people
American audio engineers
Best Sound Mixing Academy Award winners
People from New York City
Engineers from New York City